Foul was a football fanzine that was first published in the United Kingdom in October 1972 by Cambridge University students. It was inspired by Private Eye and is regarded as being the first recognisable football fanzine. 34 issues were published between 1972 and 1976. One of its writers was Chris Lightbown. Stan Hey, Steve Tongue and Andrew Nickolds were also regular contributors. "Vince of the Villa", a strip cartoon, was composed and illustrated by Lee Porter.

It was set up at a time when fanzines were being produced for a number of different topics, in order to provide a challenge to the mainstream media. Nearly 10 years after Foul ceased publication a new wave of football fanzines commenced publishing after the Heysel and Bradford disasters. Many, including 'When Saturday Comes', were inspired by Foul.

References

1972 establishments in the United Kingdom
1976 disestablishments in the United Kingdom
Football fanzines
Magazines established in 1972
Magazines disestablished in 1976
Defunct magazines published in the United Kingdom